Gore Island may refer to:

 Gore Island (Queensland) in Australia
 Gore Island (Baja California) in Mexico